The 1970 Bowling Green Falcons football team was an American football team that represented Bowling Green University in the Mid-American Conference (MAC) during the 1970 NCAA University Division football season. In their third season under head coach Don Nehlen, the Falcons compiled a 2–6–1 record (1–4 against MAC opponents) and outscored their opponents by a combined total of 178 to 118.

The team's statistical leaders included Vern Wireman with 622 passing yards, Julius Livas with 279 rushing yards, and Bill Pittman with 235 receiving yards.

Schedule

References

Bowling Green
Bowling Green Falcons football seasons
Bowling Green Falcons football